An indie role-playing game is a role-playing game published outside traditional, "mainstream" means.  Varying definitions require that commercial, design, or conceptual elements of the game stay under the control of the creator, or that the game should just be produced outside a corporate environment.

Independent publication of role-playing games
Indie role-playing games (RPGs) can be self-published by one or a few people who themselves control all aspects of design, promotion and distribution of the game.  An independent role-playing game publisher usually lacks the financial backing of large company. This has made forms of publishing other than the traditional three-tier model more desirable to the independent publisher.

Formats
Independent publishers may offer games only in digital format, only in print, or they may offer the same game in a variety of formats. Some major RPG publishers have abandoned PDF publication, probably as a counter-piracy effort.    Common digital formats include HTML, text, blog, or PDF form.   Gamers may print the game documents, use a in electronic form on a laptop, or use an eReader.    Desktop publishing technologies have allowed indie designers to publish their games as bound books, which many gamers prefer.   The advent of print on demand (POD) publishing has recently lowered the costs of producing an RPG to the point at which role-playing games can be produced and distributed with minimal financial investment.  Indie games are often conflated with small press games, because of the great overlap between creator ownership and small press publishing.

Distribution methods
Disintermediation is a key concept in indie game distribution; independent publishers typically lack established business relationships with distributors and retailers. Indie distribution is often achieved directly by the game's creator via e-commerce or in-person sales at gaming conventions.  However, some fulfillment houses and small-scale distributors do handle indie products using the traditional three tier system.

Several organizations specialize in sales of indie games using a two-tier system. Indie Press Revolution distributes games that it labels as independent.  RPGNow and DriveThruRPG were two companies that sold such small press offerings (as well as mainstream products) as downloadable PDFs. RPGNow created a separate storefront for low-selling or new entries to this market. Initial plans called for this storefront to use the "indie" moniker, but it was eventually decided to call the storefront RPGNow Edge instead. As of 2007, RPGNow Edge is not operating. RPGNow and DriveThruRPG were consolidated into a single company, OneBookShelf, which maintained both sites initially. In August 2007, the two sites were rebranded, with RPGNow bearing the subtitle: "The leading source for indie rpgs". In November 2018, OneBookShelf announced they were shutting down RPGNow and merging it with DriveThruRPG. By February 2019, all elements of RPGNow (including purchase library) redirect to similar pages on DriveThruRPG. All of the above sites include creator-owned content, as well as other products that are not readily identified with the role-playing game industry mainstream.

Business models
Some publishers have no interest in financial success; others define it differently than most mainstream companies by emphasizing artistic fulfillment as a primary goal. The division between what is technically profitable and what would be considered financially viable for a business is another oft-debated element of independent role-playing publishing. Some independent publishers offer free downloads of games in digital form, while others charge a fee for digital download.

Disputed definitions
Some contend that the term "indie" applies only to members of a self-defined "indie" RPG community.  The definition of indie in the context of role-playing games is difficult, because the role-playing game industry operates with a different organization and smaller scale than the video games, publishing or music industries.  The dynamics that inspired well-known independent movements in these industries, such as the independent film movement, are not necessarily present in the role-playing game industry.  Even prominent role-playing game companies often publish on a comparatively small scale.  Thus, the RPG industry is unlike larger creative industries, whose indie communities formed to react to elaborate bureaucracies and corporate control of content.  The question of whether indie role-playing games can be defined precisely, abstractly or not at all sparks ongoing discussion among RPG hobbyists and creators.

Indie communities
As indie roleplaying game publishers are often not professionally trained or experienced publishers, a number of communities have developed over time where designers and publishers can share experiences, collaborate, and support each other.

The Forge
One self-identified indie RPG community was centered on The Forge. Overseen by Ron Edwards, this community generally defined indie games as those where the creator maintains control of his or her work and eschews the traditional publishing and sales model, though there are exceptions.  The Forge was strongly influenced by Ron Edwards' essay "System Does Matter".

In the Forge community, indie RPGs often represented a more narrativist school of game design, focusing on strong characters confronting difficult moral choices.  These games were often strongly tied to a very specific setting; in this respect, they could be seen as the antithesis of generic role-playing game systems. This was not always true however, since many games from that community instead focused on play dynamics that can be transplanted to a number of settings. For example, a game might focus on the moral question "What will you do to get what you want?" but was not tied to playing the question out in any particular fictional world. No matter the strategy, tightly focused designs were a hallmark of this community.

Games of note from the Forge community include, in roughly chronological order:
 Sorcerer: An Intense Role-playing Game (2001) by Ron Edwards
 The Burning Wheel (2002) by Luke Crane
 Donjon (2002) by Clinton R. Nixon
 Dust Devils (2002) by Matt Snyder
 My Life with Master (2003) by Paul Czege
 Dogs in the Vineyard (2004) by Vincent Baker
 Primetime Adventures (2004) by Matt Wilson
 Shock: Social Science Fiction (2006) by Joshua A.C. Newman

The Forge was started in 1999 by Ed Healy as an information site, with Ron Edwards serving as the editorial lead. In 2001, Ron and Clinton R. Nixon recast the site, centered on the community forum that existed until 2012.

Story Games
Story Games was a discussion forum dedicated to role-playing games that focused on shared story creation. A majority of the games discussed and created on Story Games were indie and/or small press games.  While the site did not offer any games for sale, several creators used it to discuss design issues, report progress, and promote their games.  Some games were hosted on the Story Games site.  The wiki section hosted information on over 80 story games as well as a variety of related resources. The story-games forum ceased operation on August 15, 2019. The site intended to remain up in a read-only form until August 2020. Two sites that emerged to support the story-game community include The Gauntlet Forums and Fictioneers.

Other communities
Many other groups self-identify as producing games outside the mainstream. Many of these primarily sell PDFs, with some supplementary print sales at specific venues. One example is Wicked Dead Brewing Company. This imprint includes games by a number of designers. Game designer Greg Stolze has produced games using the Ransom model, without resorting to traditional publishing and sales. Others, such as the Free RPG Community, pursue self-publishing without any intent to make a profit. Self-publishing sites such as Lulu.com also have a number of RPGs available from publishers unaffiliated with any formal community.

Footnotes
  The three-tier model is a distribution model with three levels: publisher, distributor and retailer.
  The two-tier model is a distribution model with two levels: publisher and retail outlet.
  Example formats are: The Shadow of Yesterday first edition (HTML) and  revised edition (text), and FATE (pdf).

References

 
Role-playing game terminology